Metropolitan Theodosius may refer to:

 Theodosius, Metropolitan of Moscow in 1461–1464
 Theodosius (Lazor), primate of the Orthodox Church in America (OCA) in 1977–2002